The Moto E5 is the 5th generation of the low-end Moto E family of Android smart phones developed by Motorola Mobility. It comprises three submodels: E5 Play, E5 and E5 Plus. They were released in April 2018. The base model costs $99, putting this phone in the budget segment of the smartphone market. This phone is often praised for having long battery life, although it tends to have low performance due to the dated processor and video card.

Submodels comparison 

† Not counting camera bump, which adds  to E5 Plus depth/thickness.

References 

Android (operating system) devices

Motorola smartphones